8kids is a German post-hardcore band based in Darmstadt, Hesse, formed in 2013.

History 
8kids was formed in 2013 by Hans Koch and Jonas Jakob, both being Vocalists and guitarists in the band, who previously played in local underground bands in Darmstadt. A short time later Emma McLellan became the band's drummer.

On 26 March 2016 the band signed a contract with music distributor Melodie der Welt and concert agency Ever Ever Management. The band signed a label contract with Austrian metal label Napalm Records a month before signing to Melodie der Welt. In April the band released their first music video for the song Alles löst sich auf (engl. Everything Dissolves) which premiered at the homepage of German music magazine Visions. 8kids released their debut EP Dämonen (Demons) at the end of the same month. In August 2016 the band performed at Olgas-Rock in Oberhausen, Northrhine-Westfalia.

The band toured alongside To the Rats and Wolves in Germany, Austria, Switzerland and the Czech Republic. Shortly after the release of the debut album Denen die wir waren (Those Who We Were) the band toured Germany again as headliner with support of German metal band Anorak. In September and October of the same year another tour throughout Germany, Austria and Switzerland followed, this time supporting German rock act Van Holzen.

In January and February 2018 the band toured Germany again. 8kids spend the summer performing at several music festivals including With Full Force, Mini-Rock, EselRock and Hurricane Festival.

Musical style 
At the beginning of their career the band's lyrics were written in English. When McLellan joined the duo to become the band's drummer, they switched from English lyrics to German. The band's music on the debut EP Dämonen was described as dynamic, containing emotional components and influences from pop music mixed with a blend of screamo. The music was compared to German metalcore act Caliban and some emo bands.

The lyrics were described as profound. The song Zeit (engl. Time) deals with the theme of sorrow. The song is based on a past relationship of band member Hans Koch, with which he struggled with for a long period of time. The band worked on the song for almost two years.

Discography

Members 

Current band members
 Hans Koch – vocals, guitar (since 2013)
 Jonas Jakob – vocals, guitar (since 2013)
 Leif - drums (since 2022)

Past band members
 Emma McLellan – drums (2013—2022)

External links

References 

German alternative rock groups
Musical groups established in 2013
Post-hardcore groups
2013 establishments in Germany